Local elections were held in Armenia on 26 May, 17 November and 8 December. The 5 May elections included the elections for Yerevan City Council.

References

2013 elections in Europe
2013 elections in Asia
2013 in Armenia
2013